Frank A. Silva (October 31, 1950 – September 13, 1995) was an American set dresser and occasional actor best known for his performance as the evil spirit Killer BOB in the TV series Twin Peaks.

Silva had a degree in lighting design from San Francisco State University and worked as a prop master and set decorator on several films including David Lynch's Dune and Wild at Heart.

Silva worked on Lynch's Twin Peaks. According to David Lynch on the 2007 Gold Edition DVD release of Twin Peaks, Lynch was upstairs in the Laura Palmer house, near Silva as he worked, and suddenly realized that Silva might have a place in the show. He asked Silva if he was an actor, and Silva said that he was. Lynch then shot a scene where Silva was crouched at the foot of Laura Palmer's bed, staring at the camera, with no idea of where it would fit into the film. Later, while shooting a scene where Laura's mother is remembering a traumatic event, camera operator Sean Doyle told Lynch they'd have to repeat the scene because a crew member had accidentally been caught in a reflection. Lynch asked who, and Doyle told him it was Silva. Seeing this as a sign, Lynch decided to keep the shot as it was. Thus was born the character of Killer BOB, a dark spirit who haunts Laura. Silva appeared occasionally as BOB for the remainder of the Twin Peaks series and in the 1992 movie Twin Peaks: Fire Walk with Me. His first major appearance was in the International Version of the Twin Peaks pilot, which contained a standalone ending that resolved the mystery of the series and incorporated the accidental footage.

Silva appears in the Anthrax video "Only".

Frank Silva died on September 13, 1995, aged 44 from AIDS-related complications. The second episode of the revived Twin Peaks was dedicated to Silva.

References

External links

1950 births
1995 deaths
American people who self-identify as being of Native American descent
American people of Portuguese descent
American designers
Native American male actors
Portuguese male actors
American male film actors
American male television actors
AIDS-related deaths in Washington (state)
20th-century American male actors
San Francisco State University alumni